Daniel Kogler (born 16 August 1988) is an Austrian footballer, who played as a midfielder.

Career

Club career
He had previously played for Austrian SKN St. Pölten and SV Bad Aussee, Bosnian FK Velež Mostar, Hungarian BFC Siófok and back in Austria with FC Waidhofen/Ybbs.

External links
 Nemzeti Sport 
 HLSZ 
 Daniel Kogler coaching profile at ÖFB

1988 births
Living people
People from Amstetten, Lower Austria
21st-century Austrian people
Austrian footballers
Association football midfielders
SKN St. Pölten players
SV Bad Aussee players
FK Velež Mostar players
BFC Siófok players
FC Waidhofen/Ybbs players
LASK players
Austrian expatriate footballers
Expatriate footballers in Bosnia and Herzegovina
Expatriate footballers in Hungary
Austrian expatriate sportspeople in Bosnia and Herzegovina
Austrian expatriate sportspeople in Hungary
Footballers from Lower Austria